Orłów may refer to the following places:
Orłów, Lesser Poland Voivodeship (south Poland)
Orłów, Łódź Voivodeship (central Poland)
Orłów, Subcarpathian Voivodeship (south-east Poland)
Orłów, Sochaczew County in Masovian Voivodeship (east-central Poland)
Orłów, Szydłowiec County in Masovian Voivodeship (east-central Poland)

See also
Orły